Prince of Lu is a title in imperial China. It may refer to:
 Princes of Lu during the Han dynasty and Cao Wei dynasty
 Li Congke (885–937), Later Tang emperor, earlier known as Prince of Lu (潞王)
 Zhu Yihai (1618–1662), Southern Ming emperor, earlier known as Prince of Lu (魯王)
 Ren Zhu (died 1867), prince or King of the Nien Rebellion